El Chiflón del Diablo or The Devil's Blast (in reference to the natural draft that flows through the mine) is a mine located in Lota, Chile.  After coal production fell in the Lota area in the 1990s, the mine was shut down. Currently, El Chiflón del Diablo serves as tourist attraction.

References

External links

 Lota Sorprendente
 El Chiflón del Diablo's Website.

Coal mines in Chile
Mines in Biobío Region
Underground mines in Chile
Mining museums
Former mines in Chile